The Criterion Hotel, formerly the Regatta Hotel, is a hotel in Perth, Western Australia. It is the only remaining Art Deco hotel in the Perth central business district.

Heritage listing
The hotel was entered on the Western Australian Register of Heritage Places in 1996.

References

Hotels in Perth, Western Australia
Hay Street, Perth
Hotel buildings completed in 1937
State Register of Heritage Places in the City of Perth